Vuga is a 2000 Nigerian adventure film directed by Simi Opeodu. It tells the story of a strong man who uses his strength and ability to save his village from terror. In August 2018, the main character in the film, "Vuga", was listed as one of the ten best Nigerian film characters of the 90s and 2000s.

Cast
Gentle Jack
Chiwetalu Agu
Segun Arinze
Regina Askia
Larry Koldsweat
Ramsey Nouah

References

External links

Nigerian adventure drama films
2000 films
English-language Nigerian films
2000s English-language films